Tikaboo Peak is the unofficial name for a mountain in Lincoln County, Nevada, United States  to the east of Area 51. It is the closest publicly accessible vantage point with a view of the area.

Tikaboo Peak is used because the government closed two closer vantage points to Area 51 — Freedom Ridge and White Sides — to public access in 1995, due to the number of people photographing or filming the base from these sites.

References 

Mountains of Nevada
Landforms of Lincoln County, Nevada